Paul Gildea (born November 1957) is an Australian musician, music educator and talent manager. He is best known as the lead guitarist and backing vocalist for the band Icehouse.

Early life
Gildea was born in Coburg, Victoria in November 1957, one of four children. He initially wanted to play drums, but received his first guitar at age 12. He completed his secondary education at Melbourne High School and went on to complete a Bachelor of Business degree majoring in Sociology.

Musician
Gildea played in numerous bands from age 15. In 1990 Gildea was invited to join Icehouse to replace Bob Kretschmer. He took a break from the band in 2004, rejoining in 2007.

From 1998 to 2000, Gildea was also a touring member of Little River Band, replacing Peter Beckett. That was the last occasion that Little River Band would consist entirely of Australian members.

Gildea was also the lead guitarist for James Reyne, Vika and Linda Bull and Rick Price.

Music educator
Gildea is the Academic Course Manager in the Bachelor of Applied Business in Music Industry course at Box Hill Institute.

He was previously the Senior Coordinator, Entertainment & Arts Management at the Melbourne campus of the Australian Institute of Music.

Talent manager
Through his company Paul Gildea Artist Management, Gildea is the manager of sisters' band Stonefield and The Voice finalist and current Icehouse band member Michael Paynter. Gildea previously managed defunct band Motor Ace.

References

Living people
1957 births
Australian music educators
Australian musicians
Australian rock guitarists
Icehouse (band) members
Little River Band members
Talent managers